Death in Arizona is a 2014 autobiographical documentary film by Tin Dirdamal about his return to the empty home of a former lover.

Synopsis 

Tin Dirdamal returns for answers to an old apartment in Bolivia where he used to live with his lost love. While Tin spends his days in there, watching how time passes by outside the windows, he imagines a post apocalyptic story of what he sees happening in the street.

Release 

Death in Arizona was part of the official selection at international festivals such as Visions du Réel International Film Festival Nyon, Taiwan Documentary Film Festival, Guanajuato International Film Festival and Morelia International Film Festival.

References

External links 
 
 https://www.sundance.org/blogs/creative-distribution-initiative/kickstart-death-in-arizona
 https://moreliafilmfest.com/en/peliculas/muerte-en-arizona/

Autobiographical documentary films
2014 films